George Decatur Fallon (July 8, 1914 – October 25, 1994) was a backup second baseman/shortstop in Major League Baseball who played for the Brooklyn Dodgers and St. Louis Cardinals (-). A native of Jersey City, New Jersey, Fallon batted and threw right-handed. He debuted on September 27, 1937, and played his final game on July 13, 1945.

In a four-season career, Fallon posted a .216 batting average (61-for-282) with one home run and 21 RBIs in 133 games played. One notable moment in Fallon's career—he was the first batter to face Cincinnati Reds pitcher Joe Nuxhall when the then 15-year-old Nuxhall made his major league debut on June 10, . Nuxhall retired Fallon on a groundout.

Fallon died in Lake Worth, Florida, at age 80.

Sources
 .

External links

 RetroSheet

1914 births
1994 deaths
Brooklyn Dodgers players
St. Louis Cardinals players
Major League Baseball second basemen
Major League Baseball shortstops
Baseball players from Jersey City, New Jersey
Minor league baseball managers
Sportspeople from Jersey City, New Jersey
Reading Brooks players
Allentown Brooks players
Akron Yankees players
Elmira Colonels players
Elmira Pioneers players
Rochester Red Wings players
Mobile Bears players
St. Paul Saints (AA) players
Hollywood Stars players
Nashville Vols players